Moriah is an unincorporated community in southeastern Person County, North Carolina, United States, south of Surl, and east-southeast of Timberlake.

References

 

Unincorporated communities in Person County, North Carolina
Unincorporated communities in North Carolina